Damian Kitschke (born 13 May 1966) is a former Australian rules footballer who played with St Kilda in the Australian Football League (AFL).

Kitschke, a ruckman and forward, started his career at Sturt, in 1986. He was selected by St Kilda with pick 57 in the 1987 National Draft and played 29 games for the club over the course of two seasons.

References

External links
 
 

1966 births
Australian rules footballers from South Australia
St Kilda Football Club players
Sturt Football Club players
Living people